Harbinger Corporation was a leader in e-commerce software and network services. Founded in December 1983 by C. Tycho Howle and David Leach as Computer Technologies for the Home in Atlanta, Georgia, it went public in August 1995. It was purchased by Peregrine Systems on 16 June 2000. Originally located at 1800 Century Place, the company relocated to 1055 Lenox Park Blvd. in the early 1990s.

At its peak, Harbinger had 1,100 employees, 40,000 active customers, and annual revenues exceeding $155 million.

After Peregrine went into bankruptcy following 2002 accounting scandals, certain lines of business purchased from Harbinger and Extricity were sold off to Golden Gate Capital and Cerberus Capital Management and ultimately renamed Inovis. For a while, Inovis' European operations used the name Harbinger Commerce.

The Harbinger brand became part of Inovis in 2002, which was then acquired by GXS in 2010.

References

External links
 A list of alumni who the Harbinger Alumni Group would like to locate
 Inovis web site
 Inovis blog

American companies established in 1983
American companies disestablished in 2000
Software companies established in 1983
Software companies disestablished in 2000
Defunct software companies of the United States